Pisces Iscariot is a compilation album by American alternative rock band the Smashing Pumpkins, released in 1994 through Virgin Records, consisting of B-sides and outtakes. Reaching number 4 in the US upon its 1994 release, Pisces Iscariot was certified platinum by the RIAA on November 23, 1994. The album was initially to be called Neptulius.

The album was re-released by EMI as a deluxe edition CD and LP on July 17, 2012.

Packaging 
The CD, LP, and cassette issues were each released with unique cover artwork. The US vinyl release was pressed on amber vinyl, and the first 2,000 copies included a bonus 7-inch single with "Not Worth Asking" from the original "I Am One" 7-inch, backed with "Honeyspider II". The UK LP has identical artwork to its US counterpart, although the printing is much lighter and the inner sleeve is a heavier stock.

Reception 
According to a December 1, 1994, review by Al Weisel, writing for Rolling Stone, "Pisces Iscariot doesn't really sound like the compilation of rejects it actually is. In fact, it's better than a lot of albums that bands labored hard to put together. Although definitely not the Pumpkins' best album, it's more varied, if less cohesive, than Gish or Siamese Dream." Rolling Stone gave 3 out of 5 stars to the album.

Deluxe release
In 2012, EMI released a "Deluxe Edition" that included a cassette tape with the first Smashing Pumpkins demo tape on it. The deluxe version of Pisces Iscariot is listed by Spotify under the band's main "album" section (along with its studio albums), rather than in the "compilations" section. According to Ian Cohen, writing for Pitchfork, "Pisces Iscariot is painstakingly sequenced to maintain a concept record's sonic peaks and valleys, favoring stylistic cohesion over protracted diversity. Its ratio of sweet acoustic strummers, barnstorming riff-rockers, and expansive guitar freakouts is balanced almost exactly akin to that of Siamese Dream or Gish. It still works as an album if you want it to, meaning it's not exactly Incesticide or Masterplan as far as alt-rock cash-ins go."

Legacy 
In July 2014, Guitar World placed Pisces Iscariot among its "Superunknown: 50 Iconic Albums That Defined 1994" list. For the 20th anniversary of the album, Ryan Leas, writing for Stereogum, commented that "[e]very now and then, a band releases a collection of B-sides and outtakes and otherwise semi-available material that transcends the notion of an artist emptying the vaults to buy a bit of time between full-fledged albums, or simply trying to cash in a bit.... Of the already anomalous nature of these odds-and-ends turned important touchstones in an artist’s catalog, Pisces Iscariot is amongst an even rarer category: the very early vault emptying that results in a shockingly strong collection of lesser or entirely unknown songs. So shockingly strong, in fact, that an album like Pisces Iscariot is often placed head and shoulders above almost anything Billy Corgan did after, save the following year's monolithic Mellon Collie And The Infinite Sadness."

Track listing 

A limited pressing of 2,000 copies of Pisces Iscariot included a free 7-inch single.

Personnel

The Smashing Pumpkins
 Jimmy Chamberlin – drums
 Billy Corgan – vocals, guitar, production, photography, packaging
 James Iha – guitar, vocals, production
 D'arcy Wretzky – bass guitar

Production
 Kerry Brown – production and drums on "Blew Away"
 Dale "Buffin" Griffin – production
 Ted de Bono – production
 Rachel Gutek – design assistant
 Michael Meister – photography, packaging
 Butch Vig – production

Charts

Weekly charts

Year-end charts

Single

Certifications

Release history

References

External links 
 
 

B-side compilation albums
Albums produced by Butch Vig
Albums produced by Billy Corgan
Albums produced by James Iha
The Smashing Pumpkins compilation albums
1994 compilation albums
Virgin Records compilation albums